Marshall County Schools is a school district headquartered in Moundsville, West Virginia, serving all of Marshall County.

Schools
High schools:
 Cameron High School
 John Marshall High School

Middle schools:
 Moundsville Middle School
 Sherrard Middle School

Elementary schools:
 Cameron Elementary School
 Center McMechen Elementary School
 Central Elementary School
 Glen Dale Elementary School
 Hilltop Elementary School
 McNinch Primary School
 Sand Hill Elementary School
 Washington Lands Elementary

Preschool and Kindergarten:
 Marshall County Pre-K & Kindergarten

Other:
 Gateway Achievement Center

References

External links
 Marshall County Schools
School districts in West Virginia
Education in Marshall County, West Virginia